Ctibor Jech (born 28 August 1983) is a Czech former professional ice hockey player who played mainly with HC Bílí Tygři Liberec in the Czech Extraliga.

His father of the same name has been a staff member (coach and general manager) at the Liberec club since the 1980s.

References

External links

Czech ice hockey forwards
HC Bílí Tygři Liberec players
Living people
1983 births
People from Liberec District
Sportspeople from the Liberec Region
HC Vrchlabí players
HC Berounští Medvědi players
HC Slovan Ústečtí Lvi players
Springfield Jr. Blues players
Czech expatriate ice hockey players in the United States